The 1948 Delaware State Hornets football team represented Delaware State College—now known as Delaware State University—as a member of the Colored Intercollegiate Athletic Association (CIAA) in the 1948 college football season. The Hornets compiled a 4–5 record under coach Tom Conrad. Of their five losses, three of them were by 40 points or more.

Schedule

References

Delaware State
Delaware State Hornets football seasons
Delaware State Hornets football